Viktor Špišić (born 8 June 1982 in Sisak, SFR Yugoslavia) is a Croatian retired footballer, who played as a midfielder. His first club was Segesta Sisak. He played both as a defensive and attacking midfielder.

Career
Špišić began his career in his hometown as player of HNK Segesta. Then he was transferred to Bulgarian side Beroe Stara Zagora. In early 2007 he signed for Sofia. He later had a spell in the Austrian fifth tier.

References

External links
 

1982 births
Living people
People from Sisak
Association football midfielders
Croatian footballers
HNK Segesta players
PFC Beroe Stara Zagora players
FC Lokomotiv 1929 Sofia players
NK Karlovac players
First Professional Football League (Bulgaria) players
Croatian Football League players
First Football League (Croatia) players
Austrian 2. Landesliga players
Croatian expatriate footballers
Expatriate footballers in Bulgaria
Croatian expatriate sportspeople in Bulgaria
Expatriate footballers in Austria
Croatian expatriate sportspeople in Austria